The women's artistic gymnastics individual all-around competitions at the 2013 Mediterranean Games in Mersin was held at the Mersin Gymnastics Hall on 23 June 2013.

Format competition

The qualifiers in the qualification phase (limit two per NOC), based on combined score of each apparatus, advanced to the individual all-around final. The finalists performed on each apparatus again. Qualification scores were then ignored, with only final round scores counting.

Schedule
All times are Eastern European Summer Time (UTC+3)

Qualifications

Final

References

 https://web.archive.org/web/20130623012609/http://info.mersin2013.gov.tr/disiplineDetails_GA.aspx

Gymnastics at the 2013 Mediterranean Games
2013 in women's gymnastics